Calderbank is a surname. Notable people with the surname include:

Anthony Calderbank, British translator
Leonard Calderbank (1809–1864), British Roman Catholic priest
Robert Calderbank (born 1954), American computer scientist, electrical engineer, and mathematician